Norma (AK-86) was never commissioned and thus never bore the USS designation. Norma is the name of constellation.

The ship was built as a Maritime Commission type N3-M-A1 cargo vessel at Penn-Jersey Shipbuilding Corp. intended for naval and Lend Lease service as M.C. hull 649 assigned the name MV Summer Pierce before being laid down on 3 December 1943. Norma was delivered to the Navy on 6 June 1944 and transferred to the U.S. Army on the same day. Norma was  renamed Henry Wright Hurley by the Army and began conversion into a U.S. Army Engineer Port Repair ship for service with the U.S. Army Corps of Engineers.

Army Port Repair Ship 

The Army converted the ship into one of ten Engineer Port Repair ships for use by the Army Engineers in clearing war damaged ports. These ships were extensively modified with a distinctive appearance the result of heavy lift bow horns with a forty ton lift capacity. The converted ship saw little or no service as intended as it was one of the conversions completed in 1945.

Final disposition 
The ship was returned to the Maritime Administration 8 August 1947 and sent into the National Defense Reserve Fleet, Suisun Bay, Benicia, California. On 31 March 1965 Henry Wright Hurley was sold to Zidell Explorations, Inc., Portland, Oregon for scrapping.

Notes

References

External links 
 United States Army in World War II - The Corps of Engineers: Troops and Equipment - Chapter XVII - Preparing to Reconstruct Ports

 

Port repair ships of the United States Army
Enceladus-class cargo ships
Ships built in New Jersey
1944 ships
Type N3 ships of the United States Army
World War II auxiliary ships of the United States